Jennifer and Tom Shay Ecological Reserve is an ecological reserve located on the east bank of the Red River, near the town of St. Adolphe, Manitoba, Canada. It was established in 2004 under the Manitoba Ecological Reserves Act.

See also
 List of ecological reserves in Manitoba
 List of protected areas of Manitoba

References

External links
 iNaturalist: Jennifer and Tom Shay Ecological Reserve

Protected areas established in 2004
Ecological reserves of Manitoba
Nature reserves in Manitoba
Protected areas of Manitoba